José Pérez (born 13 April 1945) is a Dominican Republic weightlifter. He competed in the men's light heavyweight event at the 1968 Summer Olympics.

References

1945 births
Living people
Dominican Republic male weightlifters
Olympic weightlifters of the Dominican Republic
Weightlifters at the 1968 Summer Olympics
Sportspeople from Santo Domingo
20th-century Dominican Republic people